Chris Schramm (born 30 May 1984) is a former motorcycle speedway rider from England.

Speedway career
He rode in the top tier of British Speedway for various teams, the last of which was riding for the Belle Vue Aces during the 2012 Elite League speedway season. He began his career riding for Berwick Bandits in 2000 and rode for 19 different clubs throughout his career before retiring in 2014.

References 

1984 births
Living people
British speedway riders
Belle Vue Aces riders
Oxford Cheetahs riders